Farhatabad  is a village in the southern state of Karnataka, India. It is located in the Gulbarga taluk of Kalaburagi district.

Demographics
 India census, Farhatabad had a population of 5211 with 2616 males and 2595 females.

See also
 Gulbarga
 Districts of Karnataka

References

External links
 Official Website of Gulbarga district
 search engine of Gulbarga district

Villages in Kalaburagi district